Othelosoma is a genus of land planarians found in Africa and India.

Description
The genus Othelosoma is characterized by having an elongate, rounded body, generally only two eyes and a blunt anterior end. The copulatory apparatus has a permanent penis. The bursa copulatrix is large and communicates with the genital atrium by two canals, the vaginal duct and the Beauchamp's canal.

Species
There are 40 species assigned to the genus Othelosoma:

Othelosoma africanum (von Graff, 1899)
Othelosoma angolense (de Beauchamp, 1951)
Othelosoma caffrum (Jameson, 1907)
Othelosoma chinum (Marcus, 1955)
Othelosoma conyum (Marcus, 1953)
Othelosoma cylindricum (de Beauchamp, 1913)
Othelosoma duplamaculosum Sluys & Neumann, 2017
Othelosoma evelinae Marcus, 1970
Othelosoma flavescens (Jameson, 1907)
Othelosoma gnaum Marcus, 1955
Othelosoma gravelyi (de Beauchamp, 1930)
Othelosoma hepaticarum (Jameson, 1907)
Othelosoma hirudineum (de Beauchamp, 1930)
Othelosoma huntum Marcus, 1955
Othelosoma impensum Sluys & Neumann, 2017
Othelosoma joburgi Jones, 2004
Othelosoma kukkal (de Beauchamp, 1930)
Othelosoma laticlavium Sluys & Neumann, 2017
Othelosoma lineaenigrum Sluys & Neumann, 2017
Othelosoma macrothylax (de Beauchamp, 1936)
Othelosoma marcusi de Beauchamp, 1956
Othelosoma marlieri de Beauchamp, 1956
Othelosoma musculosum (de Beauchamp, 1930)
Othelosoma nigrescens (Mell, 1904)
Othelosoma notabile (von Graff, 1899)
Othelosoma nyanga Jones & Cumming, 2005
Othelosoma polecatum Marcus, 1953
Othelosoma pugum Marcus, 1953
Othelosoma retractile (de Beauchamp, 1930)
Othelosoma rudebecki Marcus, 1955
Othelosoma saegeri Marcus, 1955
Othelosoma sholanum (de Beauchamp, 1930)
Othelosoma simile Sluys & Neumann, 2017
Othelosoma speciosum (von Graff, 1896)
Othelosoma symondsii Gray, 1869
Othelosoma torquatum (de Beauchamp, 1930)
Othelosoma voleum Marcus, 1953
Othelosoma wauzen Marcus, 1955

References

Geoplanidae
Rhabditophora genera